Agonopterix pupillana is a moth of the family Depressariidae. It is found in Italy and Austria.

References

External links
lepiforum.de

Moths described in 1887
Agonopterix
Moths of Europe